Rostami may refer to:

Rostami (place), including a list of places with the name
Rostami (surname), including a list of people with the name

See also

Rostam (disambiguation)